KSL Capital Partners is a Private-equity firm based in Denver, Colorado specializing in travel and leisure investments.  Many of the investments have involved Colorado ski resorts.

Since its founding in 2005, the firm has raised more than $13 billion.

The company traces is roots to 1992 with the founding of KSL Recreation by Kohlberg Kravis Roberts (in particular Henry Kravis), Mike Shannon and Larry Lichliter, all of whom had investments in the ski resorts in the Vail, Colorado area.  KSL Recreation became KSL Resorts, owning Grand Wailea Resort, La Quinta Resort, Doral Golf Resort, Arizona Biltmore Hotel, Claremont Resort, and Lake Lanier Islands  KSL Resorts was sold to CNL Hospitality in 2004.

Shannon -- minus his two previous partners but with new partner Eric C. Resnik -- created KSL Capital Partners in 2005 following the 2004 sale of KSL Resorts.

Notable projects
The Belfry
Grove Park Inn
The Homestead
La Costa Resort
ClubCorp
Palisades Tahoe (formerly Squaw Valley)
Alpine Meadows
Whistler Blackcomb
Blade (company), sponsor of NASDQ listing

References

Links
 KSL Capital Partners (company website)

Private equity firms of the United States
Financial services companies established in 2005
Companies based in Denver